The 3rd Annual Premios Juventud (Youth Awards) were broadcast by Univision on July 16, 2006. This was the first edition be held in the month of July.

Winners and nominees

Music

Films

Sports

Fashion and Image Category

She's Got Style
 Anahí
 Dulce María
 Jennifer Lopez
 Thalía

He's Got Style
 Alfonso Herrera
 Chayanne
 Daddy Yankee
 Luis Fonsi

What a Hottie!
 Alfonso Herrera
 Chayanne
 Christopher Uckermann
 Daddy Yankee

Girl of My Dreams
 Anahí
 Bárbara Mori
 Dulce Maria
 Thalía

Supermodel
 Adriana Lima
 Amelia Vega
 Dayanara Torres
 Gisele Bündchen
 Sissi

Pop Culture category

My Idol is...
 Daddy Yankee
 Dulce María
 RBD
 Thalía

Hottest Romance
 Ana Bárbara & Jose Maria Fernandez
 Aracely Arámbula & Luis Miguel
 Dulce María & Guillermo "Memo" Ochoa
 Luis Fonsi & Adamari López

Paparazzi's Favorite Target
 Ana Bárbara & José María Fernández
 Luis Miguel
 RBD
 Thalía

Special awards

Most Searched (Internet)
RBD

Supernova Award
Maná

Diva Award
Ivy Queen

Performers
Alejandra Guzmán - Volverte Amar
Alicia Villarreal
Anaís
Calle 13 - Atrevete-te
Chelo - Cha Cha
Don Omar - Angelito
Ivy Queen - Te He Querido, Te He Llorado 
Kumbia Kings - Pachuco
La India featuring Cheka
Maná - Labios Compartidos
Ninel Conde - Bombon Asesino
Rakim & Ken-Y featuring Héctor el Father
Reik - Noviembre Sin Tí
Thalía featuring Anthony "Romeo" Santos - No, No, No

Presenters & arrivals
A.B. Quintanilla
Adriana Fonseca
Adrian Alonso
Alessandra Rosaldo
Alexis & Fido
Alfonso Herrera
Ana Carolina da Fonseca
Anahí
Ana Layevska
Ana María Canseco
Carmen Dominicci
Christian Chávez
Cristián de la Fuente
Daisy Fuentes
Dulce Maria
Eduardo Cruz
Felipe Viel
Fernando Arau
Giselle Blondet
Jackie Guerrido
Jan
Jorge Ramos
Karla Martínez
Karyme Lozano
Kate del Castillo
La Secta AllStar
Lidia Avila
Lili Estefan
Luny Tunes
Marisa Del Portillo
Marlene Favela
Mayte Perroni
Milka Duno
Nek
Rafael Amaya
Raúl De Molina
Raúl González
RBD
Sherlyn
Verónica del Castillo
Wisin & Yandel

References

External links
Premios Juventud Official Site  
Premios Juventud 2006 official Winners 

Premios Juventud
Premios Juventud
Premios Juventud
Premios Juventud
Premios Juventud
Premios Juventud
Premios Juventud
2000s in Miami